Rey or Rey Khas is a small village in Kangra district at borders of Himachal Pradesh, India along a rivulet  to which Talwara & Hazipur are the nearer towns in plains of Punjab  while Indora & Fatehpur Tehsil H.Q in Himachal are farther in the hills. One can reach Rey Khas by train up to Mukerian (MEX) or Pathankot (PTX). MDR 42 road passes through Rey Khas connecting NH 44 with NH 503, nearest airport is Pathankot Airport .

History
Rey was famous in history as harbour over Beas River and was designated as shikargah or (imperial hunting grounds) in mughal maps especially for Nilgai game. Bairam Khan is reputed to have taken refuge there with his army at 'Bairun the ban' after defeat at Battle of Gunecur and finally surrendered to Mughals at Hajipur (20km from Rey Khas) in 1560. Rey Shikargah has survived as Pong Dam Lake Wildlife Sanctuary near Talwara which is about 6 km from Rey Khas. 

In 1823  Sikh Empire awarded Rey Jagir to their courtier Ishri Singh, a descendant of Nurpur kingdom and British Raj continued to recognize his son Sham Singh as successive Jagirdar in 1846 till the post lapsed due to Doctrine of lapse after the death of his son Kishen Singh in 1882 which was renewed by another member of family's parallel branch General Shankar Singh of Jammu and Kashmir (princely state). From 1899 Mian Raghunath Singh remained Jagirdar of Rey till 1942 and Col. Hoshiar Singh remained last Jagirdar when the post was abolished in 1952.  The heritage building at Rey Kothi are from jagirdari era.

Demographics
Re Khas is a medium size village located in Fatehpur Tehsil of Kangra district, Himachal Pradesh administrated by Sarpanch (Head of Village) who is elected representative of 430 resident families from ten villages: 
1. Aghar, 2. Banihani Gujran, 3. Beh.	4. Beli Rajianla, 5. Bhadrial,	6. Ghumali, 7. Kharela, 8. Kulali, 9. Rey Khas, 10.Sarela

Economically and socially Rey Khas village is advanced  than average Himachal Pradesh village, reflected in  higher statistics compared to state average.

 Sex ratio is 1003 females per 948 males, higher than state average of 970 female per 1000 males.
 Literacy rate is 83.15 % compared to state average of 82.80 %. 
 Average Sex Ratio is 1058 while state average of 972.
 Child Sex Ratio is 1131, while than state average of 909.

Temples
Radha-Rukmani-Sham Mandir  As per the inscription on temple dating back to 1843, the black marble statue was brought from Rajasthan by the Jagirdar Sham Singh,   descendent of Nurpur kingdom  whose sister was married to Raja Dhian Singh, Prime Minister of Sikh Empire.
Kotli Mata Mandir is a temple dedicated to Kotli Mata situated at the top most point of the area is of very ancient times.
Prachin Shiv Mandir a Shiv pindi of a size of 10 feet came out of land during British times and was turned into Shiva temple .

Notable personalities
Mian Raghunath Singh, Jagirdar of Rey wrote a vernacular history book in 1904 which became a reference to many English authors of 20th century like John Hutchinson, John Beames, Alexander Cunningham, J Vogel. It was translated by Govt. of Himachal Pradesh in 2004.
Gen Anant Singh Pathania, MVC belonged to this place
Virendera Singh Pathania, VC flying ace was born here.

References 

Villages in Kangra district